Lü Zhiwu, more commonly spelled "Lv Zhiwu", (born March 18, 1989 in Wenzhou, Zhejiang) is a Chinese swimmer, who competed for Team China at the 2008 Summer Olympics and 2012 Summer Olympics.  At the 2012 Summer Olympics, he was part of the Chinese 4 x 200 m team that won bronze.

Major achievements
2005 National Games – 8th 100 m freestyle;
2007 National Intercity Games – 1st 100 m free, 2nd 50 m freestyle ;
2008 National Champions Tournament – 3rd 50 m freestyle
2012 Olympics - 3rd 4 x 200 m freestyle

Records
2008 National Champions Tournament – 3:17.07, 4 × 100 m free (AR)

See also
China at the 2012 Summer Olympics – Swimming

References

http://2008teamchina.olympic.cn/index.php/personview/personsen/5374

1989 births
Living people
Chinese male freestyle swimmers
Olympic swimmers of China
Sportspeople from Wenzhou
Swimmers at the 2008 Summer Olympics
Swimmers at the 2012 Summer Olympics
Swimmers from Zhejiang
Olympic bronze medalists for China
Olympic bronze medalists in swimming
Asian Games medalists in swimming
Swimmers at the 2010 Asian Games
Medalists at the 2012 Summer Olympics
World Aquatics Championships medalists in swimming
Asian Games gold medalists for China
Asian Games silver medalists for China
Medalists at the 2010 Asian Games
21st-century Chinese people